Pirates in the Indian Ocean have threatened international shipping since the mid-2000s. This list documents vessels attacked in 2010: for other years, see List of ships attacked by Somali pirates.

January

February

March

April

May

June

July

August

September

October

November

December

External links
European Union Naval Force-Somalia, Key Facts and Figures

References

Piracy in Somalia

2010 in Somalia
Somalia transport-related lists
2010-related lists